Masirah Island, also referred to as Mazeira Island or Wilāyat Maṣīrah, is an island off the east coast of mainland Oman in the Arabian Sea, and the largest island of the country.

Administratively, it forms one of the five provinces (Wilayah, plural Wilayat) of the Ash Sharqiyah South Governorate. Previously it was a province of the Ash Sharqiyah Region. The principal village is Raʾs-Ḥilf in the northern part of the island. It contains a Royal Air Force of Oman air base and a fish factory, as well as a few small towns. Previously, the BBC had a relay facility consisting of both HF and MF broadcasting transmitters stationed there. The main industries are fishing and traditional textile manufacturing. Formerly, traditional shipbuilding was important.

Most of the island's interior is deserted, with access to the island only possible by a small ferry for cars or by Royal Air Force of Oman Airbus A320 flights.

History
Neolithic, Bronze Age and Iron Age archaeological sites are dotted over the island, with one study finding shell middens dating to 6000BC, stone axes from 3000BC and fish line sinkers from 4000BC The Magan Civilization was present, with archaeological records from 2000-2700BC, Indus region pottery shards, and local copper mining in small quantities around 1500BC.

The Periplus of the Erythraean Sea, a periplus dated to between AD 40 and 70 describes Masirah island, then called Isle of Serapis:

There was occupation by the Portuguese navy in the sixteenth century. The modern history of the island is little researched, but we know the fishermen were accomplished sailors, constructed their own boats, and trade with the mainland was well advanced. In the 1950s the sheikh lived on the East coast at Ra's al Ya.

Landscape
The rugged terrain of the island and surrounding rough coastline has led to the appearance of many wrecked dhows on the beaches of the island, most of them well preserved by the salt water and intense heat. On 21September 1835, the USS Peacock grounded on a coral reef.

The ocean bottom environment surrounding Masirah is hostile as the majority of the area is covered in either sand or hard rock. There is a swift current flowing through the area with a very sharp halocline visible on the surface of the ocean. The water depth nearby is around 10 m and is not conducive to side-scan sonar searches due to the shallow water and choppy surface conditions. Despite the poor quality ocean bottom, the area is very productive with marine fisheries, and any hard objects (barrels, engines) are immediately colonized by local fauna.

During summer there is normally a constant strong wind which is ideal for kite and windsurfers. Big waves are a result of the wind on the sea side and is so also attractive for wave surfers. Kite and windsurfers can pick spots around the island according to their skill and what conditions they prefer.

On 5–6 June 2007, 7000 people on the island were forced to temporarily leave their homes due to the high storm waves produced by the powerful  Cyclone Gonu, the strongest to hit the Persian Gulf region in 60 years.

Geography 

The hills along the east side of the island are separated from the island coast by a narrow sandy plain; they run nearly its entire length. A steep plateau stands in the middle of the range on the northeast side of the island. Along the west side of the island, there are a few low hills separated from the east range by an extensive sandy plain marked by several hillocks:
 Ras Abu Rasas, the south extremity of Al Masirah, is low and rocky. It houses the Masirah lighthouse.
Haql (Hakkan), a small village in a grove of trees, lies close to the shore about eight km north of Ras Kaydah.
 Ras Zafaranat is rocky with hills rising abruptly.
 Jabal Madrub rises about  farther west-northwest.
 Ras al-Jazirah, about six km north-northwest of Ras al-Ya, is rocky and well-marked by a black patch on its south side.
 Jazirat Thukhayr, a sandy islet close north of Ras al-Jazirah, lies on a drying reef connected to the shore.
 The coast between Ras al Jazirah and Ras Qudufah, the northeast extremity of the island, about  further north-northwest, is indented by a bay. A cairn stands on a hill close south of Jabal al-Jidufa, and a small monument stands close southwest of Ras Qudufah.

Climate
Saiq has a hot desert climate (Köppen climate classification BWh) with hot summers and warm winters. Precipitation is low, and falls mainly from February to April as well as in the brief monsoon season from June to August.

Tourism

Masirah Island opened for tourism in the 1990s. One can still only get to the island by ferry, managed by the National Ferry Company, which runs six times a day between Shannah to Masirah.

There are hotels and a kitesurfing camp. Rental cars are available on the island.

Military base

The British established a military presence on Masirah in the 1930s. A small stone building, a fuel store for land based aircraft flying between Aden and Muscat, stood at the midpoint of the island on the west side, and had a stone above the door inscribed "RAF 1936".

A dispute between British forces and the local inhabitants took place in 1942, led by one of two local sheikhs, who were eventually forced to flee the island.

During WW II, The British paid the Sultan of Muscat a stipend of £18,000 per annum for affording British forces 'necessary facilities', which included Masirah. A Cabinet Office memorandum of 1945 recommended the acquisition of Masirah on a 99-year lease, US interests in the island notwithstanding (During World War II the United States also had a base on the island.). The Sultan was to be offered an annual payment of £3,750 with an initial premium of £7,500. The base continued to expand into the 1970s, supporting British and Oman forces fighting insurgents during the Dhofar Rebellion and providing transit facilities for long-distance RAF flights.

The British military presence at RAF Masirah extended until 31 March 1977, when Sultan of Oman's Air Force (now the Royal Air Force of Oman) took over the base, which became first SOAF Masirah and then RAFO Masirah.  In the 1970s, the base included a HF communications hub and a rear link to SAS units and british Royal Engineer Units based in Oman in support of the actions against rebels in the south of the country (RAF Salalah). United States' units used Masirah Island as a staging base in Operation Eagle Claw, the unsuccessful 1980 attempt to free US hostages then held in Iran. The island was subsequently used as a staging area for operations into Afghanistan in 2001.

, the American private military contractor DynCorp had a contract to staff and serve a US military storage-depot at this base.

Radio Relay Station
In 1966 Masirah took on a new role, it became the base for the British Middle East Relay Station. This was built by the British Diplomatic Wireless Service to be a relay station for the World Service of the BBC. The station had been previously based in Somalia and Perim called the East Africa Relay Station. These stations were both closed as the politics of the region changed. The station was badly damaged by a Hurricane in 1976 but was rebuilt and handed over to the BBC in 1985.

Ecology
The island is an important hatching ground for loggerhead sea turtles, similar in importance to the beaches at Ras al Hadd and nearby Ras al-Jinz as a hatching ground for green sea turtles. Critically endangered humpback whales also migrate in the waters surrounding the island and Masirah gulf.

Economy
Historically, the island had copper ore mining dating back to the Bronze Age. The fishing industry, building on a long tradition, is centered on the north coast, and includes a fish processing plant.

See also

 Duqm
 List of lighthouses in Oman
 Socotra, another hilly/mountainous island off the coast of the Horn of Africa

References

Bibliography

 .

External links

 A military history
 Sailing Directions (with geographical information)

Islands of Oman
Ash Sharqiyah South Governorate
Lighthouses in Oman